Cylindrospermum is a genus of filamentous cyanobacteria found in terrestrial and aquatic environments. In terrestrial ecosystems, Cylindrospermum is found in soils, and in aquatic ones, it commonly grows as part of the periphyton on aquatic plants. The genus is heterocystous (nitrogen-fixing) cyanobacteria.

References

Nostocaceae
Cyanobacteria genera
Taxa named by Friedrich Traugott Kützing